Frank Kieffer Martin (November 4, 1938 – August 12, 2012) was an American defense attorney and a former mayor of Columbus, Georgia.  Martin was born in Columbus in 1938. He was elected 64th mayor of that city in 1990, succeeding James Jernigan.  During Martin's tenure as mayor, he championed a new 1-percent sales tax that went on to fund a new civic center, public safety building, and recreational facilities.  Under Martin's leadership Columbus also won a bid to host the 1996 Olympic softball competition.  Martin served as mayor of Columbus from 1991 to 1994. He died from complications of pancreatic cancer in 2012 at the age of 73.

References

1938 births
2012 deaths
Mayors of Columbus, Georgia
Georgia (U.S. state) lawyers
Deaths from pancreatic cancer
20th-century American lawyers